Erika Heucke (born 20 November 1942) is a German former volleyball player. She competed in the women's tournament at the 1972 Summer Olympics.

References

External links
 

1942 births
Living people
German women's volleyball players
Olympic volleyball players of West Germany
Volleyball players at the 1972 Summer Olympics
People from Northeim (district)
Sportspeople from Lower Saxony